Careerism is the propensity to pursue career advancement, power, and prestige outside of work performance.

Cultural environment

Cultural factors influence how careerists view their occupational goals. How an individual interprets the term "career" can distinguish between extreme careerists and those who can leave their career at the door when they come home at night.

Schein identifies three important aspects of cultural environments and careerism:

 how culture influences the concept of careerism
 how culture influences the importance of a career relative to personal and family matters
 how culture influences the bases of marginal careers

The term "career" was once used for the purposes of status. Career was thought of as a long-term job opportunity, that many, in fact would hold until retirement. In the United States especially after World War II, those who were lucky enough to find a career would stay with the same organization for decades. A career was seen as an upper middle class, professional service, identified as the work of a doctor, lawyer, investor, banker or teacher. "Occupations" were seen as lower-class human services jobs, such as those of a taxi driver, clerk, secretary, or waste manager. These "jobs" were not held in the high regard that "careers" were.

In the 2000s, the average American does not stay with the same company, business or organization until retirement.

In regard to commitment, an individual must rely and commit to the occupational setting, the family setting, and to his own setting. Careerist must determine what is the most important factor in their lives. To the career extremist, it is the occupational setting. Some organizations require the individual to be in "work-mode" at all times, while others believe that family time is more important. Most Latin American countries value family and personal time, whereas the United States pushes for a stronger workforce in regard to careerism. In the United States this is mainly because of the push for education. Currently the United States ranks 10th among industrial countries for percentage of adults with college degrees. With this push in education many people have better careers and are then able to have the choice of family matters, personal matter, or career matters. Even though in the United States careerism is very important, family life is also a huge part of the culture. Many people start their families even while in school, then they begin their careers. Recently the importance of family matters and career matters has evolved and is becoming more and more tied together.

Cultures exert pressure and determine what career motives are acceptable and how their success is measured. Vyacheslav Molotov noted the role of careerism in the Soviet government in the 1930s: "Сыграл свою роль наш партийный карьеризм" [Party-oriented careerism played out its own role].

Extreme careerists measure success by acknowledgements through praise and material possessions, whether it be a new office, a raise or a congratulations in front of an individual's colleagues: notice is success. In the U.S. there is an extreme drive of personal success and those who are ambitious are the ones who gain the power in an organization.

See also

Sources and references

 Adrian Furnham (2008) Personality and Intelligence at Work, New York: Psychology Press.
 Buchanan Robert, Kong-Hee Kim, Randall Basham (2007) "Career orientations of business master's students as compared to social work students: Further inquiry into the value of graduate education", Career Development International 12(3): 282–303.
 Ronald J. Burke, Eugene Deszca (1982) "Career Success and Personal Failure Experiences and Type A Behaviour", Journal of Occupational Behavior 3(2):161–70, 
 Edgar H. Schein (1984) "Culture as an Environmental Context for Careers", Journal of Occupational Behaviour 5(1), A Special Issue on Environment and Career, pp. 71–81 
 Daniel C. Feldman, Barton A. Weitz (1991) "From the invisible hand to the gladhand: Understanding a careerist orientation to work", Human Resource Management 30(2):237–257.
 Gratton, Peter (2005) "Essays in Philosophy", A Biannual Journal 6, DePaul University. 2 May 2009 .
 Griffin, Ricky W. (2004) Dark side of organizational behavior, San Francisco: Jossey-Bass.
 Inkson, Kerr (2006) Understanding Careers The Metaphors of Working Lives, Minneapolis: Sage Publications, Inc.
 Miller, Seumas (2007) Police ethics, St. Leonards, NSW: Allen & Unwin.
 Harold L. Wilensky (1964) "The Professionalization of Everyone?, American Journal of Sociology 70(2):137–58, University of Chicago Press

Career development